Idealism, also known as Turgeshism is a nationalistic ideology developed by Alparslan Türkeş and the Nationalist Movement Party as a principle of the Nine Lights Doctrine.

The philosophy of Idealism was largely influenced by the ideas of Ziya Gökalp, a Turkish sociologist, writer, and poet. Gökalp believed that the Turkish people needed to create a new national identity that was distinct from their Ottoman past and grounded in their own cultural, historical, and linguistic traditions. He argued that this new identity ("Turkishness") should be based on the principles of Islam and Turkish nationalism, and that it should be promoted through education and cultural institutions.

Idealism has had a significant influence on Turkish political and intellectual thought, and its ideas continue to shape the country's political and cultural landscape today.

Origin 
The origins of the name go back to the terms "millî mefkure (ülkü)" used by Ziya Gökalp and "millî ülkü" used by Nihal Atsız and Pan-Turkists. 1950–1953 it was used by Turkish Nationalists Association during its years. Ülkü means "ideal" in terms of the word meaning. Ülkücülük is the equivalent of "idealism".

On 3 May 1944, a large group protested the prosecution of Nihal Atsız in Istanbul as well as in Ankara and his friends marched from the Ankara courthouse to Ulus square. Although the Turkism movement was a national policy in the state levels during the time of Atatürk, it begins with this event that it became a mass idea.

See also 
 Alparslan Türkeş
 Nationalist Movement Party
 Grey Wolves
 Hüseyin Nihal Atsız
 Nine Lights Doctrine

References

 
Idealism
Turanism
Pan-Turkism
Turkish nationalism
National conservatism
Political ideologies
Political movements in Turkey
Nationalist Movement Party